Crossocheilus obscurus is a species cyprinid fish. It occurs on Sumatra (Indonesia) and in Peninsular Malaysia. It lives in fast flowing steams with rocky substrate.

Crossocheilus obscurus grows to  standard length.

References

Further reading
Murni, Mida Yulia, and Dewi Imelda Roesma. "Inventarisasi Jenis-Jenis Ikan Cyprinidae di Sungai Batang Nareh, Kabupaten Padang Pariaman." Jurnal Biologi Universitas Andalas 3.4 (2014).

Crossocheilus
Cyprinid fish of Asia
Freshwater fish of Sumatra
Freshwater fish of Malaysia
Fish described in 2009
Taxa named by Maurice Kottelat
Taxa named by Heok Hui Tan